Cameron Brown is a video game director. His most notable works are as the Creative Director on Mercenaries: Playground of Destruction, Mercenaries 2: World in Flames, and Rec Room.

Games 
 Rec Room (video game) (2016), Rec Room Inc. [As Chief Creative Officer]
 The Saboteur (2009), Electronic Arts UK Ltd.
 Mercenaries 2: World in Flames (2008), Electronic Arts, Inc.
 Destroy All Humans! (2005), THQ Inc.
 Mercenaries: Playground of Destruction (2005), LucasArts
 KKND2: Krossfire (1998), Melbourne House
 The Dame Was Loaded (1996), Philips Interactive Media, Inc.
 Radical Rex (1994), Activision, Inc.
 True Lies (1994), Acclaim Entertainment, Inc.

Interviews 

 "Digital Bruckheimer: Cameron Brown On Mercenaries 2", Christian Nutt, Gamasutra, April 17, 2008.
 "Pandemic's Cameron Brown hints Mercenaries 3, Mercenaries for Wii", QJ Staff, QuickJump Gaming network, April 17, 2008.
 "Pandemic's Cameron Brown on Christopher, Jennifer, and Mattias of Mercenaries 2". QJ Staff, QuickJump Gaming network, May 28, 2007.
 "Jennifer Mui Introduction with Cameron Brown", IGN.com, 31 August 2008.
 "Mercenaries 2:World in Flames - Zero Rules - Co-Op", Electronic Arts, 24 August 2008.
 "Mercenaries 2: World in Flames", Robert Purchese, Eurogamer, 17 April 2008.
 "Mercenaries - The Director Speaks", Will Tuttle, GameSpy, 6 January 2005.
 "Q&A: Pandemic on Mercenaries 2: World in Flames", GameSpot.
 "Interview with Cameron Brown: Producer on Mercenaries", Xbox World Australia, 4 February 2006.
 "Building community in a virtual world: Moderation tools in VR”, Code Newbie podcast, season 1, episode 2, August 24, 2017.
"First GDC 2018 VR Talks Include Rec Room, Google and Penrose, UploadVR, 5 January 2018.

References

External links 
 
 

American video game directors
Living people
Year of birth missing (living people)